Brian Raftopoulos is a Mellon Senior Research Mentor at the Centre for Humanities Research at the University of the Western Cape and a former Associate Professor of Development Studies at the University of Zimbabwe. He first emigrated to South Africa in 2006 to serve as Director of Research and Advocacy in the human rights NGO Solidarity Peace Trust.

Notes

Living people
Historians of Africa
Zimbabwean expatriates in South Africa
Alumni of St. George's College, Harare
Academic staff of the University of Zimbabwe
Academic staff of the University of the Western Cape
Zimbabwean historians
20th-century historians
21st-century South African historians
Year of birth missing (living people)